Robert Paton (c. 1854 – 17 February 1905) was a Scottish footballer who played as a forward.

Career
Born in Bonhill, Paton played club football for Vale of Leven, and made two appearances for Scotland in 1879. He was a founder member of Vale of Leven and was part of the team that won the Scottish Cup in 1877, scoring the winning goal in the final's second replay. He was still with the club when they retained the trophy in 1878 and 1879, but he did not take part in either of those finals. According to historical records of Queen's Park, Paton was the first player ever to score against the Glasgow club in January 1875.

Personal life
Some publications assert that Daniel Paton, also an international from the same neighbourhood, was his brother, but this was found to be incorrect.

References

1850s births
1905 deaths
Scottish footballers
Scotland international footballers
Vale of Leven F.C. players
Association football forwards
Year of birth uncertain
People from Bonhill
Footballers from West Dunbartonshire